

Witta was a medieval Bishop of Lichfield. He was consecrated in 737 and died between 749 and 757.

Notes

Citations

References

External links
 

8th-century English bishops
Anglo-Saxon bishops of Lichfield
750 deaths
Year of birth unknown